Gabriel Betancourt Mejía (born April 27, 1918 in Medellín – died March 23, 2002 in Bogotá) was a Colombian economist and diplomat who served as Colombia's Minister of National Education in two occasions, and Permanent Delegate to UNESCO.

Early life
Gabriel Betancourt was born in Medellín on April 27, 1918 to Pedro Nolasco Adriano Betancur Toro and Mariana Mejía Arango as the youngest of 9 children.

Betancourt was a member of the government of president Gustavo Rojas Pinilla. He later became assistant director of the United Nations Educational, Scientific, and Cultural Organization (UNESCO). He was also head of the education commission of the Alliance for Progress in Washington, D.C. under John F. Kennedy.

Personal life
Gabriel Betancourt was the father of the politician and former FARC hostage Íngrid Betancourt. Gabriel Betancourt divorced his wife Yolanda Pulecio in 1980 and was granted custody of his daughters. Gabriel Betancourt died of heart and respiratory trouble a month after Íngrid's kidnapping, without seeing his daughter again.

References

1918 births
2002 deaths
Gabriel
Colombian Ministers of National Education
People from Medellín
Permanent Delegates of Colombia to UNESCO